Michael Horton or Mike Horton may refer to:

Michael Horton (theologian) (born 1964), professor of theology at Westminster Seminary, California
Michael Horton (actor), American character actor and voice over artist
Michael J. Horton, New Zealand film editor 
Mike A. Horton (born 1973), CEO and President of Crossbow Technology
Mike Horton (Days of Our Lives), a character on the soap opera Days of Our Lives